Sydney Wrangel Clarke (1864 - 1940) was a British lawyer and magic historian.

He is most well known for his book The Annals of Conjuring. It was originally published in the Magic Wand magazine (1924-1928). Four book copies were printed in 1929, making original copies excessively rare. It was reprinted in 1983 and 2001.

He was the chairman of the council for The Magic Circle, a position he held until 1935.

Publications

The Bibliography of Conjuring and Kindred Deceptions (1920)
The Annals of Conjuring (1929, 1983, 2001)

References

1864 births
1940 deaths
British lawyers
Historians of magic
Place of birth missing
20th-century British writers